Guy Katz (born 12 May 1982) is a German professor, writer, TEDx speaker, and businessman.

Katz's dissertation "Intercultural Negotiation – the Unique Case of Germany and Israel" is considered the first research in the field of intercultural relations regarding German-Israeli business negotiations. He also received a scholarship from "Ernst-Ludwig-Ehrlich-Studienwerks (ELES)" for outstanding research. Katz speaks regularly at German-Israeli events, has accompanied various delegations to Israel, and is the founder of the Bavarian-Israeli Partnership accelerator, a joint initiative of the two countries which allows intercultural entrepreneurial teamwork.

Katz served as a board member for the Jewish community of Munich and Upper Bavaria in the period 2012-2016.

References

1982 births
Living people
Academic staff of the Munich University of Applied Sciences
20th-century German Jews
German male writers
Israeli male writers
Place of birth missing (living people)